Fear and Loathing in America: The Brutal Odyssey of an Outlaw Journalist 1968–1976 is a collection of hundreds of letters Hunter S. Thompson wrote (as well as a handful he received) after his rise to fame with his 1966 hit Hell's Angels: The Strange and Terrible Saga of the Outlaw Motorcycle Gangs. These letters deal primarily with Thompson and his editor at Random House, Jim Silberman, his correspondence with Oscar Zeta Acosta, and his perpetually fluctuating relationship with Jann Wenner, the founder of Rolling Stone.

Through this time period, Thompson discusses Fear and Loathing in Las Vegas, Fear and Loathing on the Campaign Trail '72, and his unending desire to see The Rum Diary made into a film.

In this second volume of letters – the first being The Proud Highway: The Saga of a Desperate Southern Gentleman 1955–1967' – an insight into Thompson's eccentricity and brilliance is found.

References

Further reading

Essay collections by Hunter S. Thompson
2000 non-fiction books
American non-fiction books
Simon & Schuster books